Jingshan Park is an imperial park covering  immediately north of the Forbidden City in the Imperial City area of Beijing, China. The focal point is the artificial hill Jingshan, literally "Prospect Hill". Formerly a private imperial garden attached to the grounds of the Forbidden City, the grounds were opened to the public in 1928. The park was formally established in 1949. It is listed as a Key State Park and is administratively part of Xicheng District in downtown Beijing.

History

Jingshan's history dates to the Liao and Jin dynasties, almost a thousand years ago. All of this material was moved by manual labor and animal power. Jingshan consists of five individual peaks, and on the top of each peak there lies an elaborate pavilion. These pavilions were used by officials for gathering and leisure purposes. These five peaks also draw the approximate historical axis of central Beijing.  

The dictates of feng shui long praised tombs and residences sited south of a nearby hill, serving to channel both harmful yin and cold northern winds. With Jingshan serving that purpose, it gained the name Feng Shui Hill. It is also well known to locals as Coal Hill, from an old rumor that the emperors kept a hidden stash in the park.

The Chongzhen Emperor, the last ruler of the Ming dynasty, committed suicide by hanging himself from a tree in Jingshan in 1644 after Beijing fell to Li Zicheng's rebel forces.

Relationship with the Forbidden City 
Jingshan Hill is separated from the Forbidden City by the palace moat. However, until 1928 the park sat directly by the moat and was accessible on the south side only from the Forbidden City via the Gate of Divine Might. In 1928, a new road (New Jingshan Street) was built to the north of the palace moat. This fully separated Jingshan Hill from the Forbidden City. The Gate of Divine Might became the back door of the Palace Museum, and the front gate of Jingshan Park now stood to the north of the new road.

The street addresses of both the Forbidden City and Jingshan Park are on New Jingshan Street. Jingshan Park is now a popular place for people to gather and socialize. One can often find elderly folks dancing, singing opera and doing other cultural activities, such as kuaiban, at Jingshan Park.

Access
The park has four entrances, one in each of the cardinal directions, but only three are currently open to the public. The south entrance is located across Jingshan Front Street from the Forbidden City and is accessible by Beijing Bus routes 101, 103, 109, 124, 202, 211, 609 and 685. The west entrance on Jingshan West Street and Doushan Street is a short walk from the east gate of Beihai Park and is accessible by Bus routes 5 and 609. Trolleybus routes 111 and 124 stop at the east entrance. The north entrance is currently closed to the public.  It is at the T-intersection between Jingshan Back Street and Di'anmen Inner Street and is accessible by Bus routes 5, 111, 124 and 609.

Gallery

See also
 Jingshan (disambiguation)
 Zuihuai
 List of Beijing landmarks
 Zhongnanhai
 Summer Palace
 Old Summer Palace

References

External links
 

1928 establishments in China
Xicheng District
Major National Historical and Cultural Sites in Beijing
Parks in Beijing